Chlorogenia pallidimaculata is a moth of the subfamily Arctiinae. It is found in New Guinea.

References

Lithosiini